The 1951 FIBA European Championship, commonly called FIBA EuroBasket 1951, was the seventh FIBA EuroBasket regional basketball championship, held by FIBA.  Eighteen national teams affiliated with the International Basketball Federation (FIBA) entered the competition, a record number and more than twice the number that had competed two years earlier. The competition was hosted by France, who had taken second place at EuroBasket 1949, behind 1949 hosts Egypt. The Vélodrome d'hiver, Paris was the location of the event.

72 matches were held over the course of the tournament, including the three walkovers caused by Romania withdrawing after the competition schedule had been set.

Results

First round
In the preliminary round, the 18 teams were split up into four groups.  Two of the groups had five teams each, with the others having four each.  Romania withdrew, leaving 2 groups of 5, 1 group of 4, and 1 group of 3.  The top two teams in each group advanced to the quarterfinal round.  The seven teams that had placed third and fourth moved into the classification rounds, leaving one more spot in that round two be contested in a head-to-head match between the two fifth-place teams.

Group A

Group B

{| width=75% cellspacing=1
!width=25%|
!width=25%|
!width=25%|

|- style=font-size:90%
|align=right|Soviet Union
|align=center|58–34
|Turkey
|- style=font-size:90%
|align=right|Denmark
|align=center|13 – 109
|Soviet Union

|- style=font-size:90%
|align=right|Soviet Union
|align=center|71–34
|Austria
|- style=font-size:90%
|align=right|Finland
|align=center|36–74
|Soviet Union

|- style=font-size:90%
|align=right|Turkey
|align=center|83–36
|Denmark
|- style=font-size:90%
|align=right|Austria
|align=center|18–50
|Turkey

|- style=font-size:90%
|align=right|Turkey
|align=center|60–42
|Finland
|- style=font-size:90%
|align=right|Denmark
|align=center|26–33
|Austria

|- style=font-size:90%
|align=right|Finland
|align=center|44–19
|Denmark
|- style=font-size:90%
|align=right|Austria
|align=center|27 – 53''
|Finland|}

Group C

Group D

Elimination game
The two fifth-placed teams from the preliminary groups, Denmark and Luxembourg, played a single elimination game for the honor of being the eighth team in the consolation round.  The game was perhaps the closest in Eurobasket history; it was tied at 45–45 with Peter Tatalls at the free throw line with 5 seconds left.  Tatalls made the shot, putting Denmark ahead 46–45.  Luxembourg moved the ball up to about half-court before attempting a shot just before time expired.  The shot bounced off the rim, eliminating Luxembourg from the tournament and giving Denmark their first win of the tournament as they moved into the classification round to play for 9th–16th places.

Classification round 1
The first classification round was played in two round-robin groups.  Teams advanced into the second classification round depending on their results in the first round—first and second place teams played in the 9–12 segment of classification round 2 while third and fourth place teams played for 13th to 16th places.

Group 1

Group 2

Classification round 2

 13th-16th place classification playoffs 

 9th-12th place classification playoffs 

Quarterfinals
The quarterfinal round was played in two round-robin groups.  Teams advanced into the final round depending on their results in the first round—the top two teams advanced to the medals round, while third and fourth ranked teams played for 5th to 8th places.

Group A

Group B

Final round

 5th-8th place classification playoffs 

Classification 5–8

Classification 7/8

Classification 5/6

 Medal Round: Bracket 

 Semifinals 

Bronze-medal match

Championship

Final standings
 
 
 
 
 
 
 
 
 
 
 
 
 
 
 
 
 
 

Team rosters1. Soviet Union: Otar Korkia, Stepas Butautas, Joann Lõssov, Anatoly Konev, Ilmar Kullam, Heino Kruus, Alexander Moiseev, Justinas Lagunavičius, Anatoly Belov, Vasili Kolpakov, Yuri Larionov, Evgeni Nikitin, Viktor Vlasov, Oleg Mamontov (Coach: Stepan Spandaryan)2. Czechoslovakia: Ivan Mrázek, Jiri Baumruk, Zdeněk Bobrovský, Miroslav Skerik, Jaroslav Šíp, Jan Kozák, Miroslav Baumruk, Karel Belohradsky, Miroslav Dostal, Jindrich Kinsky, Zoltan Krenicky, Jiri Matousek, Milos Nebuchla, Arnost Novak, Karel Sobota, Zdenek Rylich, Stanislav Vykydal (Coach: Josef Andrle)3. France: André Buffiere, René Chocat, Jacques Dessemme, Louis Devoti, Jacques Freimuller, Robert Guillin, Robert Monclar, Marc Peironne, Marc Quiblier, Jean-Pierre Salignon, Pierre Thiolon, André Vacheresse, Jean Perniceni, Justy Specker (Coach: Robert Busnel)4. Bulgaria''': Georgi Georgiev, Stefan Bankov, Nejcho Nejchev, Vladimir Slavov, Ilija Asenov, Petar Shishkov, Kiril Semov, Konstantin Totev, Anton Kuzov, Gencho Rashkov, Ivan Vladimirov, Dimitar Popov, Metodi Tomovski (Coach: Veselin Temkov)

References

External links
FIBA Europe EuroBasket 1951
FIBA article

1951
1951 in basketball
1951 in French sport
E
Basketball in Paris
International sports competitions hosted by Paris
1951 in Paris
May 1951 sports events in Europe